Rasborichthys helfrichii is a species of cyprinid fish found on the islands of Sumatra and Borneo in Southeast Asia.  It is the only species in its genus.

References
 

Cyprinid fish of Asia
Freshwater fish of Sumatra
Freshwater fish of Borneo
Fish described in 1860